Major Isaac Jasper Adaka Boro (10 September 1938 – 9 May 1968), fondly called "Boro", was a Nigerian nationalist, Ijaw, and soldier. He was one of the pioneers of minority rights activism in Nigeria.

He was many parts and different things to different people - a university students leader, a teacher, policeman and Nigerian army officer. An undergraduate student of chemistry and student union president at the University of Nigeria, Nsukka, he left school to lead a protest against the exploitation of oil and gas resources in the Niger Delta areas which benefited mainly the federal government of Nigeria and  Eastern region with capital in Enugu and nothing was given to the Niger Delta people. He believed that the people of the area deserved a larger share of proceeds of the oil wealth. He formed the Niger Delta Volunteer Force, an armed militia with members consisting mainly of his fellow Ijaw ethnic group. They declared the Niger Delta Republic on 23 February 1966 and fought with federal forces for twelve days before being defeated. He and his comrades were jailed for treason. However, the federal regime of General Yakubu Gowon granted him amnesty on the eve of the Nigerian civil war in May 1967. He then enlisted and was commissioned as a major in the Nigerian army. He fought on the side of the Federal Government, but was killed under mysterious circumstances in active service in 1968 at Ogu (near Okrika) in Rivers State.

Niger Delta activists like Ken Saro-Wiwa, Mujahid Dokubo-Asari and many others often referred to him as a major inspiration.

Biography

Early life 
In his autobiography, "The Twelve-Day Revolution", He wrote about his early life:
"I am reliably informed that I was born at the zero hour of twelve midnight on 10 September 1938, in the oil town of Olobiri along humid creeks of the Niger Delta. My father was the headmaster of the only mission school there. Before I was old enough to know my surroundings, I was already in a city called Port Harcourt where my father was again the headmaster of another mission school. This was in the early forties. The next environment where I found myself was in my home town, Kaiama. My father had been sent there to head a school yet again."

Niger Delta revolt 
On 23 February 1966, he declared the secession of the "Niger Delta Republic":

"Today is a great day, not only in your lives but also in the history of the Niger Delta. Perhaps, it will be the greatest day for a very long time. This is not because we are going to bring the heavens down, but because we are going to demonstrate to the world what and how we feel about oppression. Remember your 70-year-old grandmother who still farms before she eats; remember also your poverty-stricken people; remember, too, your petroleum which is being pumped out daily from your veins; and then fight for your freedom."

Legacy 
His revolt signified the first armed rebellion against the Federal Republic of Nigeria. He has been widely cited as an inspiration for both violent and non-violent Niger Delta activists.

See also 
 Isaac Boro Park
 Ken Saro-Wiwa
 Ernest Ikoli

Citations 
https://www.vanguardngr.com/2020/05/fifty-two-resounding-salutes-to-major-isaac-jasper-adaka-lion-boro/

References 

 

1938 births
1968 deaths
People from Bayelsa State
University of Nigeria alumni
Nigerian Army officers
Military personnel killed in the Nigerian Civil War
History of Rivers State
Ijaw people